The first Indian Councils Act of 1861 set up the Madras Legislative Council as an advisory body through which the colonial administration obtained advice and assistance. The Act empowered the provincial Governor to nominate four non-English Indian members to the council for the first time. Under the Act, the nominated members were allowed to move their own bills and vote on bills introduced in the council. However, they were not allowed to question the executive, move resolutions or examine the budget and not interfere with the laws passed by the Central Legislature. The Governor was also the president of the council and he had complete authority over when, where and how long to convene the council and what to discuss. Two members of his Executive Council and the Advocate-General of Madras were also allowed to participate and vote in the council. The Indians nominated under this Act were mostly zamindars and ryotwari landowners, who often benefited from their association with the colonial government. Supportive members were often re-nominated for several terms. G. N. Gajapathi Rao was nominated eight times, Mir Humayun Jah Bahadur was a member for 23 years, T. Rama Rao and P. Chentsal Rao were members for six years each. Other prominent members during the period included V. Bhashyam Aiyangar, S. Subramania Iyer and C. Sankaran Nair. The Council met infrequently and in some years (1874 and 1892) was not convened even once. The maximum of number of times it met in a year was eighteen. The Governor preferred to convene the Council at his summer retreat Udagamandalam, much to the displeasure of the Indian members. The few times when the Council met, it was for only a few hours with bills and resolutions being rushed through.

List of members 
This is the list of the official and non-official members of the Madras Legislative Council between 1861 and 1891. The number of members in the Council at a given point of time may vary due to differing appointment dates of the individual members.

See also 
Madras Legislative Council, 1891-1909

References 

Political history of the Madras Presidency
Tamil Nadu Legislative Council
1861 establishments in British India
1891 disestablishments